Leo Saputra is an Indonesian footballer who last played for Persija Jakarta. He used to play for Persibom Bolaang Mongondow and Persikota Tangerang.

Honours

Country honors
Indonesia U-18
Asian Schools Championship (1): 1996

References

Living people
1985 births
Sportspeople from the Bangka Belitung Islands
People from Pangkal Pinang
Indonesian footballers
Pelita Bandung Raya players
Sriwijaya F.C. players
Persikota Tangerang players
Persibom Bolaang Mongondow players
Persija Jakarta players
Persebaya Surabaya players
Liga 1 (Indonesia) players
Association football defenders
Association football midfielders